K–W United FC was a Canadian soccer team based in the Kitchener–Waterloo region in Ontario that played in the Premier Development League, the fourth tier of the American soccer league system. The club was originally formed in Hamilton, Ontario as Hamilton Rage FC, until moving to Kitchener-Waterloo in 2012. The men's team also had a sister women's team of the same name, who played in the USL W-League. The club ceased operations in February 2018.

History

Hamilton Rage

On February 17, 2011, the Hamilton FC Rage were announced an expansion franchise in the Premier Development League expansion franchise on February 17, 2011, when the owner's of the women's team, Hamilton Avalanche (which would also be renamed as the Hamilton FC Rage in 2011) who played in the USL W-League, decided to add a men's team to the club. The club's official name was the Hamilton Football Club (Hamilton FC). They played their first competitive game on May 25, 2011, a 2–0 loss to the Toronto Lynx. They won their first game in their second game on May 29, defeating the Ottawa Fury 5-0. The club ultimately did not make the playoffs in their first season, but the team was lauded for its professional environment by players.

K-W United
Following the 2012 PDL season, the club was sold, renamed K–W United FC, and both the men's and women's teams were relocated to Kitchener-Waterloo due to low attendance numbers in Hamilton throughout the club's two seasons. The club formed a partnership with local youth club Kitchener SC. (The club had no affiliation with SC Waterloo Region, who also played in the Canadian Soccer League and were formerly known as K-W United FC.

In 2015, after finishing 2nd in the competitive Great Lakes Division, they won the PDL Championship, defeating New York Red Bulls U-23 on August 2 in the playoff final by a score of 4–3, becoming the third Canadian club to win a PDL title after the Thunder Bay Chill in 2008 and FC London in 2012.

In 2017, they formed a partnership with Major League Soccer club Toronto FC to serve as the team's PDL affiliate for two seasons, after Toronto FC withdrew their Academy team from the PDL after the 2016 season. However, a year later, in February 2018, the club ceased operations after not being granted sanctioning to play in the US-based PDL, due to the Canadian Soccer Association wanting them to join the comparable level League1 Ontario. Over the five seasons, after missing the playoffs in their inaugural season, they qualified for the playoffs each of the other four seasons. The club had a supporters group known as the Grand River Union.

Notable former players 
This list of notable former players comprises players who went on to play professional soccer after playing for the team in the Premier Development League, or those who previously played professionally before joining the team.

Year-by-year
as Hamilton FC Rage

as K-W United

Honours
 Premier Development League Champions: 2015

Head coaches
  Brett Mosen (2011–2013)
  Stuart Neely (2014)
  Chris Pozniak (2015)
  Martin Painter (2016–2017)

Stadiums
 Brian Timmis Stadium; Hamilton, Ontario (2011)
 Ron Joyce Stadium; Hamilton, Ontario (2012)
 University Stadium; Waterloo, Ontario (2013–2017)

References

Association football clubs established in 2010
Defunct Premier Development League teams
2011 establishments in Ontario
K-W United FC
Sport in the Regional Municipality of Waterloo